Juan Carlos Carreño (born 1 July 1960) is a Chilean football manager and former footballer who played as a centre-back for clubs in Chile and El Salvador.

Playing career
Born in Santiago, Chile, as a youth player, Carreño was with Unión Española and the team of FAMAE (1977) in the Liga Capitalina of Santiago. As a professional footballer, Carreño played for both Trasandino (1978–84) and Unión San Felipe (1985) in Chile.

A historical player of Trasandino, he came to the club in 1978 and was the team captain in the 1982 season, where the team got promotion to the top division.

Then he moved to El Salvador in 1986, where he played for Águila and Alianza. As a member of Águila, he won the league title in 1987–88.

Coaching career
He has developed his entire career in El Salvador, coaching clubs such as Vendaval, Atlético Marte, and Tehuacán.

He also has worked as a coach of youth players in the Academia Futuro and served as director of Salvadoran Football Managers Association (AEFES).

Personal life
As a player of Trasandino, he was nicknamed Cañoncito (Little Cannon), due to his strong shoots.

Honours

As player
Águila
 Salvadoran Primera División: 1987–88

References

External links
 Juan Carlos Carreño at PlaymakerStats.com

1960 births
Living people
Footballers from Santiago
Chilean footballers
Chilean expatriate footballers
Trasandino footballers
Unión San Felipe footballers
C.D. Águila footballers
Alianza F.C. footballers
Primera B de Chile players
Chilean Primera División players
Salvadoran Primera División players
Chilean expatriate sportspeople in El Salvador
Expatriate footballers in El Salvador
Association football defenders
Chilean football managers
Chilean expatriate football managers
Atletico Marte managers
Expatriate football managers in El Salvador